The 1956 Sylvania Television Awards were presented on December 6, 1955, at the Plaza Hotel in New York City. Don Ameche was the master of ceremonies.  The Sylvania Awards were established by Sylvania Electric Products. Deems Taylor was the chairman of the committee of judges.

The committee presented the following awards:
 Best original teleplay - Requiem for a Heavyweight, Playhouse 90
 Best performance by an actor - Jack Palance, Requiem for a Heavyweight
 Best performance by an actress - Gracie Fields, The Old Lady Shows Her Medals
 Best performance by a supporting actor - Ed Wynn, Requiem for a Heavyweight
 Best performance by a supporting actress - Joan Loring, The Corn Is Green
 Best television adaption - A Night to Remember, Kraft Television Theatre
 Best technical production - A Night to Remember
 Outstanding dramatic series - Kraft Television Theatre
 Outstanding comedy show - The Ernie Kovacs Show
 Serious and musical series - NBC Opera Theatre
 Light musical production - The Bachelor
 New series - The Kaiser Aluminum Hour 
 Variety show - The Ed Sullivan Show
 Documentary - Project 20
 Human interest program - The Long Way Home
 Educational series - Omnibus
 Public service program - Out of Darkness
 News and special events - See It Now
 Children's program - Captain Kangaroo
 Women's show - Matinee Theater
 Special award - ABC for its political convention coverage
 Special award - Robert Sarnoff, president of NBC for "outstanding contribution to music on television"

References

Sylvania Awards